Bridgefoot, previously called Kirkton of Strathmartine, is a village in Angus, Scotland. It lies approximately one mile north of Dundee, to the west of Strathmartine Hospital.

It is said that a boulder to the North of the village marks the spot where a dragon died.

References

Villages in Angus, Scotland